Beau Geste is a 1939 American adventure film starring Gary Cooper, Ray Milland, Robert Preston, Brian Donlevy, and Susan Hayward. Directed and produced by William A. Wellman, the screenplay was adapted by Robert Carson, based on the 1924 novel of the same title by P. C. Wren. The music score was by Alfred Newman and cinematography was by Theodor Sparkuhl and Archie Stout.

Plot
French Foreign Legionnaires approach an isolated fort in the desert. The French flag is flying, but a closer inspection reveals only dead men propped up behind the parapets. However a pair of shots is fired from inside, so the bugler volunteers to scale the wall to investigate. After waiting a while, the commander follows. The bugler has vanished, and the commander finds two bodies that are not staged like the rest and a note on one confessing to the theft of a valuable sapphire called the "Blue Water". After the officer rejoins his men outside, the fort goes up in flames.

Fifteen years earlier, Lady Brandon, wife of absent spendthrift Sir Hector Brandon, takes care of the three adopted Geste brothers, "Beau", Digby and John; her ward Isobel Rivers; and heir Augustus Brandon. Years pass, and the children become young adults. They learn that Sir Hector intends to sell the "Blue Water", leaving nothing of value for Lady Brandon. At Beau's request, the gem is brought out for one last look when suddenly the lights go out and it is stolen. All present proclaim their innocence, but first Beau and then Digby depart without warning, each leaving a confession that he committed the robbery. John reluctantly parts from his beloved Isobel and goes after his brothers.

John discovers that they have joined the French Foreign Legion, so he enlists as well. They are trained by the sadistic Sergeant Markoff. Legionnaire Rasinoff overhears joking remarks by the Geste brothers, leading him and Markoff to believe that Beau has the gem.

Markoff separates the brothers. Beau and John are assigned to a detachment sent to man isolated Fort Zinderneuf. When Lieutenant Martin dies from a fever, Markoff assumes command. Fearing the sergeant's now-unchecked brutality, Schwartz incites the other men to mutiny the next morning; only Beau, John, and Maris refuse to take part. However, Markoff is tipped off by Voisin and disarms the would-be mutineers while they are sleeping. The next morning, Markoff orders Beau and John to execute the ringleaders, but they refuse.

Before Markoff can react, the fort is attacked by Tuaregs, forcing him to rearm his men. The initial assault is beaten off, but each new attack takes its toll. Markoff props up the corpses at their posts to deceive the enemy. The final assault is repulsed, but Beau is shot, leaving Markoff and John the only men left standing.

Markoff sends John to get bread and wine. He then searches Beau and finds a small pouch and two letters. When John sees what Markoff has done, he draws his bayonet, giving Markoff the excuse to shoot the only witness to his theft. However, Beau is not yet dead and manages to spoil Markoff's aim, allowing John to stab him. John and Beau hear a bugle announcing the arrival of reinforcements, Digby among them. Beau dies in his brother's arms after telling him to take one of the letters to Lady Brandon and leave the other, a confession of the robbery, in Markoff's hand. John escapes unseen.

Digby volunteers to find out why there is no response from the fort. He discovers Beau's body and, remembering his childhood wish, gives him a Viking funeral. He places Beau on a cot, with a "dog" (Markoff) at his feet, and sets fire to the barracks. Then he too deserts. He finds John outside the fort. Later, they encounter two American Legionnaire friends and begin the long journey home. Desperate for water, they find an oasis, but it is occupied by Arabs. Digby tricks them into fleeing by sounding a bugle to signal a charge by non-existent Legionnaires, but is killed by a parting shot.

John returns home, and reunites with Isobel. Lady Brandon reads aloud Beau's letter, which reveals that as a child he was hiding in a suit of armor and witnessed her selling the "Blue Water". Realizing years later she had replaced it with a fake, he had stolen the faux gem to protect her from being found out - his ‘’beau geste’’.

Cast

 Gary Cooper as Michael "Beau" Geste
 Ray Milland as John Geste
 Robert Preston as Digby Geste
 Brian Donlevy as Sergeant Markoff
 Susan Hayward as Isobel Rivers
 J. Carrol Naish as Rasinoff
 Albert Dekker as Schwartz
 Broderick Crawford as Hank Miller
 Charles Barton as Buddy McMonigal
 James Stephenson as Major Henri de Beaujolais, commander of the relief column
 Heather Thatcher as Lady Patricia Brandon
 James Burke as Lieutenant Dufour
 G. P. Huntley Jr. as Augustus Brandon
 Harold Huber as Voisin
 Donald O'Connor as Beau as a child
 Billy Cook as John as a child
 Martin Spellman as Digby as a child
 Ann Gillis as Isobel as a child
 David Holt as Augustus as a child, a despised playmate
 Harvey Stephens as Lieutenant Martin
 Stanley Andrews as Maris
 Harry Woods as Renoir, a Legionnaire deserter
 Arthur Aylesworth as Renault, another deserter
 Henry Brandon as Renouf
 Barry Macollum as Krenke
 Ronald R. Rondell as Bugler

Production
The film is a virtual scene-for-scene remake of the 1926 silent version of the same title starring Ronald Colman. This is probably the best known adaptation.

It was filmed either near Yuma, Arizona, or on government owned land in California's Imperial Valley.

Release
The film was banned in parts of Canada out of respect for the French government. The film was banned by the fascist authorities in Mussolini's Italy on the grounds that it portrayed the British too positively, and it was feared that because Britain was a democracy the film would correspondingly serve to undermine fascist ideology. The 1935 movie The Lives of a Bengal Lancer, also starring Gary Cooper, had been banned in Mussolini's Italy for the same reason.

The film's copyright was renewed in 1966.

Reception
A contemporary New York Times reviewer felt that this film did not come up to the standards of the Ronald Colman 1926 adaptation, writing that, "On the whole, it is perhaps an unfortunate thing for Beau Geste the Second that Beau Geste the First was so distinguished, for Mr. Wellman's film seems dominated by the tremendous shadow of its predecessor." One of the complaints was that the three British Geste brothers were all played by Americans. Nevertheless, the reviewer still called the production "a stirring piece of cinema".

The film has a 100% approval rating on Rotten Tomatoes.

Award nominations
Brian Donlevy was nominated for the Academy Award for Best Supporting Actor for his role in the film.

References

External links

Streaming audio
Beau Geste on The Campbell Playhouse: March 17, 1939
Beau Geste on Escape: June 6, 1948

1939 films
American adventure drama films
American war drama films
American black-and-white films
1930s English-language films
1930s adventure drama films
1939 war films
Films based on British novels
Films based on military novels
Films directed by William A. Wellman
Remakes of American films
Sound film remakes of silent films
Films about the French Foreign Legion
Paramount Pictures films
Films scored by Alfred Newman
Films set in deserts
Siege films
1939 drama films
Censored films
Films about deserters
1930s American films